Greenlawn (also known as the William Madison Otey House) is a historic residence between Meridianville and Huntsville, Alabama.  The house was built in 1849–50 by William Otey, replacing a log house built by his father in the early 1810s.  Following William and his wife's deaths, the house was taken over by one of their granddaughters in 1907.  Around 1925, the original Italianate portico was replaced with the current Greek Revival entrance, and a northern wing was added.  The house fell vacant in 1963 and was later restored, now sitting at the entrance to a subdivision of the same name.

The house has a two-story main block with a single story portion to the rear.  The façade is dominated by a tetrastyle portico with Doric order columns.  The double front door is flanked by sidelights and topped with a rectangular transom.  Two chimneys in the gable roof ends are unusual in that they are exposed below the pediment, but pass behind the tympanum before exiting the top of the roof.  The shed roof of the northern addition is hidden from the front by a wooden parapet.  The interior is laid out with a central hall, divided into an entry foyer and rear stairhall, with two rooms to either side.  The northern two rooms are separated by a narrow hall leading to a roofed porch.  The parlor and dining room on the southern side are divided by a triple-leaf folding door.  A hall and two bedrooms occupy the second floor.

The house was listed on the Alabama Register of Landmarks and Heritage in 1979 and the National Register of Historic Places in 1982.

The Otey Mansion and surrounding 300 acres were purchased by Atnip Construction in the late 1980s. The mansion serves as the focal point of the subdivision development, Greenlawn Plantation. The Otey family cemetery still exists outside of the neighborhood pool house.

References

Further reading

National Register of Historic Places in Madison County, Alabama
Houses on the National Register of Historic Places in Alabama
Greek Revival houses in Alabama
Houses completed in 1850
Houses in Madison County, Alabama